is a  volcano, located on the border of Yufu and Beppu, Ōita, Japan. It is located within Aso Kujū National Park.

Outline 

Mount Yufu is a stratovolcano. It has two peaks, called ‘Higashi-mine’ (East Peak) and ‘Nishi-mine’ (West Peak). Nishi-mine is about one meter higher than Higashi-Mine.

See also
List of islands in Japan
List of volcanoes in Japan
List of mountains in Japan

Route 
The most popular route is from Yufu Tozanguchi Bus Stop of Kamenoi Bus. It takes two and half hours. There are other routes from Yufu City and Higashi Tozanguchi Bus Stop.

Gallery

References

External links 

 Yufudake - Japan Meteorological Agency 
 Yufudake: National catalogue of the active volcanoes in Japan - Japan Meteorological Agency
 Yufu Dake - Geological Survey of Japan
 

Volcanoes of Kyushu
Mountains of Ōita Prefecture
Volcanoes of Ōita Prefecture
Stratovolcanoes of Japan